20 teams took part in the league with FC Dynamo Moscow winning the championship.

League standings

Results

Top scorers
27 goals
 Oleg Kopayev (SKA Rostov-on-Don)

21 goals
 Eduard Malofeyev (Dinamo Minsk)

17 goals
 Valentin Ivanov (Torpedo Moscow)

16 goals
 Boris Kazakov (Krylia Sovetov)

15 goals
 Vladimir Barkaya (Dinamo Tbilisi)
 Yuri Sevidov (Spartak Moscow)

14 goals
 Oleh Bazilevich (Dynamo Kyiv)
 Viktor Kanevski (Dynamo Kyiv)
 Gennadi Krasnitsky (Pakhtakor)
 Galimzyan Khusainov (Spartak Moscow)

References

 Soviet Union - List of final tables (RSSSF)

Soviet Top League seasons
1
Soviet
Soviet